SWIS may refer to
 Shen Wai International School in Shenzhen, China
 South West Interconnected System, the power grid in Western Australia
 See What I'm Saying: The Deaf Entertainers Documentary, a 2009 documentary about four deaf artists
 Swissport Tanzania, an aviation service provider in Tanzania, traded under the code SWIS